V382 Velorum, also known as Nova Velorum 1999, was a bright nova which occurred in 1999 in the southern constellation Vela. V382 Velorum reached a brightness of 2.6 magnitude, making it easily visible to the naked eye. It was discovered by Peter Williams of Heathcote, New South Wales, Australia at 09:30 UT on 22 May 1999. Later that same day it was discovered independently at 10:49 UT by Alan C. Gilmore at Mount John University Observatory in New Zealand.

In its quiescent state,  V382 Velorum has a mean visual magnitude of 16.56.   It is classified as a fast nova with a smooth light curve.

Like all novae, V382 Velorum is a binary system with two stars orbiting so close to each other that one star, the "donor" star, transfers matter to its companion star which is a white dwarf. The orbital period is 3.5 hours. The white dwarf in this system has a mass of 1.23M⊙.   V382 Velorum is a neon nova, a relatively rare type of nova with a O-Ne-Mg white dwarf, rather than the more common C-O white dwarf.

The stars forming V382 Velorum are surrounded by a small emission nebula about 10 arc seconds in diameter.

References

External links
 https://web.archive.org/web/20060517025834/http://institutocopernico.org/cartas/v382velb.gif
 https://web.archive.org/web/20050915104557/http://www.tsm.toyama.toyama.jp/curators/aroom/var/nova/1990.htm

Novae
Vela (constellation)
1999 in science
Velorum, V382